Mr. Lady Records (or Mr. Lady Records and Video) was a San Francisco-based lesbian-feminist independent record label and video art distributor. Artists on the label included Le Tigre and The Butchies.  OutSmart magazine noted that Mr. Lady was "queercore's strongest label."

The label was founded in 1996 in Durham, North Carolina by musician Kaia Wilson and artist/UNC photography professor Tammy Rae Carland, aiming to redress what they saw as a lack of feminist record labels at the time. As well as a range of recording artists, the label was also heavily involved in other events that promoted feminist thinking and music, such as the Michigan Womyn's Music Festival – which led to some controversy in 1999 – and various art showcases. Mr. Lady closed down in June 2004.

Founding
Kaia Wilson was a member of lesbian punk group The Butchies, and felt their "out politics held them back."  Without a record company to specifically represent the work of herself and other "out" female musicians, Wilson and her girlfriend, Tammy Rae Carland, found their opportunities limited.  Subsequently, they formed Mr. Lady to redress the "lack of enough women and/or dyke run record labels," which they felt led to an "extremely limited amount of affordable and accessible means for independent artists to distribute their work."  Thus, Mr. Lady Records was started with, in Wilson's words, "$35 and a lotta...faith."

Wilson stated the name "Mr. Lady" came from a trip to Italy while on tour with Team Dresch: "I saw a store called Mr. Baby, and it freaked me out. Then everyone started calling me Mr. Baby. Then I became Mr. Baby onstage. I had my own theme song and everything. I wore a little eyeliner mustache. From there it changed into Mr. Lady, which just seemed like a good name for a queer label."  It also related to Ladyman, Wilson's first solo LP, produced with the aid of Melissa York after they both left lesbian "supergroup" Team Dresch.

Artists and releases
Mr. Lady Records released recordings by groups such as Kathleen Hanna's lo-fi group Le Tigre (who released their first two records – Le Tigre and Feminist Sweepstakes – with Mr. Lady), punk group The Butchies (of whom Kaia Wilson is the lead singer), British group Electrelane, Tara Jane O'Neil, spoken-word collective Sister Spit (Sini Anderson and Michelle Tea), and others. In March 2001, Calling All Kings & Queens, a sampler album, was released which featured eighteen tracks from various artists and friends of the label, including Sleater-Kinney and Team Dresch. It followed 1999's New Women's Music Sampler.

No band that signed with Mr. Lady contained a male artist. Carland said "It's not that we're necessarily never going to put out a band with men in it, but it's just kind of organically happened that way. We wanted to focus on putting out music by women. We do consider ourselves a feminist business and part of that involves prioritizing work made by women."

Due to their work with Mr. Lady, Wilson and Carland were described as two of the "100 most influential gay people in the world" by About.com in 2002.

Growing popularity
Although initially a vehicle for Wilson to release her own albums, Mr. Lady grew into a label whose musical and political contributions gained national attention.  During a review of Tami Hart's debut release with Mr. Lady, online magazine PopMatters described the label as "one of the bright spots in new music. Whether the groups or singers are punk or indie, they are all anti-mainstream hip, political, and good – really good." Discorder magazine described the label in 2004 as "lead[ing] the way when it came to releasing music that was as politically significant as it was danceable."

Initially distributing music through mail order, the label signed a deal to distribute records nationally across the US in 2001.  The Independent Weekly described the label as having "grown from a community that perhaps needed it the most," contrasting the scarcity of a gay/lesbian-oriented label in the southern United States at the time with the many in New York.

Involvement with the Michigan Womyn's Music Festival

In 1999, Mr. Lady records (along with one of its artists, The Butchies), were involved in issues surrounding the debate as to whether transsexual women should be entitled to attend the Michigan Womyn's Music Festival, which had a formal stance against allowing transsexual and transgender women to attend the festival.  In response to a request from transgender activists to boycott the festival, Mr. Lady released a statement which defended the festival, believing that they did not consider an event for "womyn born womyn" and the transgender community to be mutually exclusive, but backed the right of the festival to exclude those not born as women.

Kaia Wilson confirmed this in a June 1999 statement: "[W]e strongly believe that transgender/transsexual people are an important part of the queer community and that they face an enormous amount of opposition. [...] We know that the MWMF started as a separatist event for womyn born womyn and we personally still feel the continued need for that kind of space and event. [...] We don't think that our support of the trans communities and womyn born womyn communities are in direct contradiction to each other."

Formally backing the festival's trans-exclusion policy led to protests and boycotts aimed towards Mr. Lady acts, Wilson and The Butchies in particular. Groups such as Camp Trans, and many participants in the queercore community, disagreed with Mr. Lady's stance and felt that the group and label exploited transgender images. The label went defunct in June 2004.

Showcases
Mr. Lady Records has sponsored numerous showcases of feminist and lesbian music, including events at the Weisman Art Museum at the University of Minnesota Twin Cities campus in Minneapolis, Minnesota (working with the Queer Student Cultural Center)  and "Mr. Sister", a showcase at the National Queer Arts Festival in 2003 at the Center for Lesbian Gay Bi Transgender Art & Culture in San Francisco.

Artists formerly on Mr. Lady

Artists formerly on Mr. Lady include:

 The Butchies
 Sarah Dougher
 Electrelane
 The Haggard
 Tami Hart
 Kiki and Herb
 Le Tigre
 The Moves
 The Need
 Tara Jane O'Neil
 Gretchen Phillips
 Amy Ray
 Sextional
 Radio Sloan
 The Sissies
 Sister Spit
 Tracy + the Plastics
 V for Vendetta
 Kaia Wilson

In popular culture
The label's name appears in the lyrics of the Le Tigre song "Hot Topic."

See also

List of record labels

References

External links
Mr. Lady website on the Internet Archive (site has been defunct since January 2005)
Alternative Mr. Lady logo on Flickr

Record labels established in 1996
Record labels disestablished in 2004
American independent record labels
Feminism in the United States
Lesbian culture in California
Lesbian feminist mass media
Lesbian history in the United States
LGBT-related record labels
Queercore record labels
Women's music
1996 in LGBT history